Boma is a port town on the Congo River, some  upstream from the Atlantic Ocean, in the Kongo Central province of the Democratic Republic of the Congo, adjacent to the border with Angola. It had an estimated population of 162,521 in 2012.

Boma was the capital city of the Congo Free State and Belgian Congo (the modern Democratic Republic of the Congo) from 1 May 1886 to 1923, when the capital was moved to Léopoldville (since renamed Kinshasa). The port handles exports of tropical timber, bananas, cacao, and palm products.

History 
Boma was founded by European merchants in the 16th century as an entrepôt, including for the slave trade. Trade was chiefly in the hands of Dutch merchants, but British, French and Portuguese firms also had factories there. No European power exercised sovereignty, though claims were from time to time put forward by Portugal.

British explorer Henry Morton Stanley arrived here on 9 August 1877, after crossing Africa from east to west.

In 1884 the people of Boma were forced to grant a protectorate of their country to the International Association of the Congo, made up of European powers. In 1886 King Leopold of Belgium established the Congo Free State, designating Boma as its capital. He ran the state as his personal fiefdom for several years, nearly enslaving many Congolese with a private military, and abusing them to force rubber production. International outrage and action by the Belgian legislature resulted in the government taking over supervision of what was established as the colony of the Belgian Congo in 1908.

Boma continued as the capital of the Belgian Congo until 1923. Léopoldville, since renamed as Kinshasa, was designated as the new capital.

Transport 
Boma lies on the north bank of the Congo River, some 100 km upstream from Muanda, where the river flows into the Atlantic Ocean.
The great width and depth of the river allow seagoing ships to reach Boma, which is the second-largest port of DR Congo, after Matadi. Between 1889 and 1984, the port was served by a 610 mm gauge railway line from Tshela.

Notable people
Antoine-Roger Bolamba, politician and poet, was born here in 1913.

Climate
Köppen-Geiger climate classification system classifies its climate as tropical wet and dry (Aw).

Gallery

See also 
 Transport in the Democratic Republic of the Congo

References

External links 

  (Images, etc.)
Boma Panorama

 
Communities on the Congo River
Populated places in Kongo Central
Populated places established in the 16th century